Walter Duch Richter (born December 7, 1945) is an American screenwriter, film director and film producer. He is best known for adapting Invasion of the Body Snatchers, directing The Adventures of Buckaroo Banzai Across the 8th Dimension and co-writing Big Trouble in Little China.

Biography
Richter graduated from Dartmouth College and attended USC Film School. He began script writing for Hollywood in the 1970s. He wrote the comedy Slither (1973), followed by two similarly styled comedies, Peeper (1975) and Nickelodeon (1976). He branched into other genres starting with the 1970s remake of Invasion of the Body Snatchers. 

He wrote scripts throughout the 1980s and 1990s. In the early 1980s, Richter formed his own production company (with producer Neil Canton), Canton/Richter, and directed The Adventures of Buckaroo Banzai Across the 8th Dimension. The film did poorly at the box office, and the company ended.

In 1981, he wrote a screenplay based on Eric Van Lustbader's novel The Ninja for Irvin Kershner to direct with Richard Zanuck and David Brown and 20th Century Fox to produce, which ultimately never got made. Richter continued to write screenplays however, and has since written Home for the Holidays and Stealth.

Filmography

References

External links
 

1945 births
Living people
American male screenwriters
Dartmouth College alumni
Writers from New Britain, Connecticut
Film directors from Connecticut
Screenwriters from Connecticut
Film producers from Connecticut